HD 93385 is a star in the southern constellation of Vela. At an apparent visual magnitude of 7.5, it is too faint to be seen with the unaided eye. This is equivalent to a physical separation of around 141 light years from the Sun. It is drifting further away with a radial velocity of +47.8 km/s.

This is an ordinary G-type main sequence star with a stellar classification of G2/G3 V. The physical properties of HD 93385 are similar to those of the Sun; it is slightly larger with 107% of the Sun's mass, 117% of the radius, and 142% of the luminosity. The abundance of elements, other than hydrogen and helium, is nearly the same as in the Sun. It is currently at an unusual low level of surface activity and thus is a candidate Maunder minimum analog.

A physical companion star with an apparent visual magnitude of 12.29 is located at an angular separation of 10.32 arcseconds (equivalent to projected separation of 448 AU) along a position angle of 288°. It is estimated to have 45% of the mass of the Sun. A 2015 survey ruled out the existence of any additional stellar companions at projected distances from 12 to 352 astronomical units.

Planetary system
This star hosts two close-orbiting, super-Earth-like planets, suspected since 2011 and confirmed in 2021. The first has 8.3 times the mass of the Earth and an orbital period of 13.186  days. The second is 10.1 times the Earth's mass with a period of 46.025 days. A third planet on an innermost orbit was discovered in 2017 and confirmed in 2021.

References

G-type main-sequence stars
Maunder Minimum
Planetary systems with three confirmed planets
Double stars

Vela (constellation)
CD-40 06283
093385
52676